Barbara of Brandenburg may refer to:

 Barbara of Brandenburg, Marquise of Mantua (1422–1481)
 Barbara of Brandenburg (1464–1515), Queen of Bohemia
 Barbara of Brandenburg-Ansbach-Kulmbach (1495–1552)
 Barbara of Brandenburg, Duchess of Brieg  (1527–1595)